Koundian  is a small town and commune in the Cercle of Bafoulabé in the Kayes Region of south-western Mali. In the 2009 census the commune had a population of 14,075.

The Toucouleur leader El Hadj Umar Tall built a fort (tata) near the village in 1857. The fort was captured by French troops led by Louis Archinard in 1889.

References

Sources
.
.
. Page 42 contains a plan of the village showing the fort.

External links
.

Communes of Kayes Region
1889 establishments in the French colonial empire